Bobs Farm is a sparsely populated rural suburb of the Port Stephens local government area in the Hunter Region of New South Wales, Australia. It is on the main road between Newcastle and Nelson Bay and is home to a number of small, boutique style vineyards and wineries and a thriving aquaculture industry. Bobs Farm Public School on Marsh Road is a co-educational government primary school which was established in 1918.

History 
The Worimi people are the traditional owners of the Port Stephens area.

Geography
Bobs Farm is the first suburb of the Tomaree Peninsula when travelling towards Nelson Bay. It is bounded on the north almost entirely by Tilligerry Creek. A small part at the north-eastern end of the northern border meets Port Stephens. The southern border is occupied entirely by Stockton Beach.

Demographics
Most of the suburb's population lies along the two main roads in the area, Marsh Road and Nelson Bay Road. Tin City, a collection of squatters shacks, is built on Stockton Beach near the border between Bobs Farm and Salt Ash.

Aquaculture industry
Bobs Farm is the centre of a thriving, environmentally friendly, aquaculture industry that exports technology. In 2007 pioneering aquaculture technology, based around a recirculating system that is the only one in the world to provide consistent reproduction, was sold for the creation of six farms in the United States. , discussions were in progress with companies in Africa, the Middle East, Europe and Asia. An education and tourism centre was constructed at the site of Tailor Made Fish Farms in 2007. In addition to it being environmentally friendly and providing consistent results, the technology developed at Bobs Farm is expected to reduce capitalisation costs.

Notes

References

External links

 Tailor Made Fish Farms

Beaches of New South Wales
Aquaculture
Suburbs of Port Stephens Council